Ancylosis insularella is a species of snout moth in the genus Ancylosis. It was described by Émile Louis Ragonot in 1893, and is known from the Seychelles.

References

Moths described in 1893
insularella
Moths of Africa